Protocadherin-10 is a protein that in humans is encoded by the PCDH10 gene.

This gene belongs to the protocadherin gene family, a subfamily of the cadherin superfamily. The mRNA encodes a cadherin-related neuronal receptor thought to play a role in the establishment and function of specific cell-cell connections in the brain. This family member contains 6 extracellular cadherin domains, a transmembrane domain and a cytoplasmic tail differing from those of the classical cadherins. Alternatively spliced transcripts encode isoforms with unique cytoplasmic domains.

References

Further reading